is a Japanese professional wrestler currently working for the Japanese promotions Gatoh Move Pro Wrestling and Ganbare Pro-Wrestling. She is also known for her work in various promotions from the independent circuit.

Professional wrestling career

Independent circuit (2018-present)
Mizumori is known for competing in various promotion of the Japanese independent scene. At SEAdLINNNG Shin-Kiba 10th NIGHT on February 28, 2019, she fell unsuccessfully challenged Nanae Takahashi for the Beyond the Sea Single Championship. At Seadlinnng Shin-Kiba Night! on October 27, 2021, Mizumori teamed up with Tokiko Kirihara and fell short to Las Fresa de Egoistas (Asuka and Makoto in a number one contendership match for the Beyond the Sea Tag Team Championship. At TJPW Inspiration #3, an event promoted by Tokyo Joshi Pro Wrestling on December 12, 2021, Mizumori teamed up with Saki in a losing effort against Magical Sugar Rabbits (Mizuki and Yuka Sakazaki). At WAVE PHASE 2 Reboot 3rd ~ NAMI 1, an event promoted by Pro Wrestling Wave on September 1, 2022, where she teamed up with Kohaku and Suzu Suzuki to defeat Haruka Umesaki, Manami and Rina Amikura as a result of a six-woman tag team match.

Gatoh Move Pro Wrestling (2017-present)
The promotion for Mizumori is best known for competing in is Gatoh Move Pro Wrestling. She usually competes in the "Choco Pro" event division of the promotion. She made her professional wrestling debut at Gatoh Move Japan Tour #319 on October 31, 2017, while still being a trainee and competed in a 12-person costume battle royal won by Kotori and also involving Antonio Honda, Aoi Kizuki, Emi Sakura, Kazuhiro Tamura, Sayaka Obihiro and others. Mizumori has a tag team with Saki, calling themselves Tropikawild. They defeated Emi Sakura and Masahiro Takanashi at Gatoh Move Japan Tour #374 on August 21, 2018 to win the Asia Dream Tag Team Championship. At Gatoh Move ChocoPro #100 on March 27, 2021, she unsuccessfully challenged Kaori Yoneyama for the Pure-J Openweight Championship.

Ganbare Pro (2020-present)
Mizumori made her first appearance in Ganbare Pro-Wrestling on October 6, 2020, at DDT Ganbare Pro Bad Communication where she teamed up with Chris Brookes to defeat Harukaze and Shota. Ganbare was still a sub-group of DDT Pro-Wrestling by that time.

World Wonder Ring Stardom (2022)
Mizumori made her first appearance for World Wonder Ring Stardom on the second night of the Stardom World Climax 2022 from March 27, where she competed in a 18-women Cinderella Rumble match won by Mei Suruga and also involving various active roster members such as Unagi Sayaka, Mina Shirakawa, Lady C, Saki Kashima and others. Mizumori is also scheduled to compete at Hiroshima Goddess Festival on November 3, 2022, where she will be facing Himeka.

Championships and accomplishments
DDT Pro-Wrestling
Ironman Heavymetalweight Championship (1 time)
Gatoh Move Pro Wrestling
Asia Dream Tag Team Championship (2 times) – with Saki
One Of A Kind Tag League (2021) – with Saki

References

1989 births
Living people
Japanese female professional wrestlers
21st-century professional wrestlers
People from Kumamoto Prefecture
Sportspeople from Kumamoto Prefecture
Ironman Heavymetalweight Champions